Sir William Carey (1 February 1853 – 27 July 1915) was Bailiff of Guernsey from 1908 to 1915. He was educated at Elizabeth College and the University of Caen Normandy.

References

Bailiffs of Guernsey
1853 births
1915 deaths
Knights Bachelor
People educated at Elizabeth College, Guernsey
University of Caen Normandy alumni
William
Place of birth missing